Emmanuel Rakotovahiny (16 August 1938 – 1 July 2020) was a Malagasy politician who was Prime Minister of Madagascar from 1995 to 1996. A close ally of Albert Zafy, he was the President of the National Union for Democracy and Development (UNDD), a political party, as well as the Vice-President of the National Reconciliation Committee (CRN), a group headed by Zafy. On 6 October 2009, he was designated to become Vice-President of Madagascar as part of an agreement intended to resolve the 2009 political crisis.

References

1938 births
2020 deaths
Prime Ministers of Madagascar